General elections were held in Luxembourg on 1 March 1925. The Party of the Right won 22 of the 47 seats in the Chamber of Deputies.

Results

By constituency

References

Chamber of Deputies (Luxembourg) elections
Legislative election, 1925
Luxembourg
1925 in Luxembourg
March 1925 events
Election and referendum articles with incomplete results